Douglas Winston Phillips (born 1965) is a Christian author, speaker, attorney, and homeschooling advocate who was once president of the now-defunct Vision Forum Ministries until he resigned due to an inappropriate relationship and allegations of sexual abuse. He advocates biblical patriarchy, creationism, homeschooling, the Quiverfull movement, and the family integrated church. He also worked for six years as a lawyer for the Home School Legal Defense Association (HSLDA).

Personal life
Phillips was born into a Christian family with Jewish heritage. His father was Constitution Party founder Howard Phillips and his mother was Margaret "Peggy" Phillips (née Blanchard). Phillips is the eldest of six children: his younger siblings being Amanda (b. 1966), Brad (b.1968), Jennifer (b.1974), Alexandra (b.1978), and Samuel Joshua (b.1986).

Phillips and his wife Beall met at college, where Doug Phillips ran a Christian newspaper and Beall ran a ministry to unwed mothers called Alternatives to Abortion. Beall Phillips was herself adopted. Together, Doug and Beall Phillips have eight children: Joshua, Justice, Liberty, Jubilee, Faith Evangeline, Honor, Providence and Virginia.

Films
Phillips is the founder of the defunct San Antonio Independent Christian Film Festival.
Phillips produced a documentary The League of Grateful Sons in 2004 about the soldiers who fought in the Battle of Iwo Jima. In 2009, Phillips led "a team of scientists and investigators, including John D. Morris, president of the Institute for Creation Research" to the Galápagos Islands for the 200th anniversary of Charles Darwin's life, and produced a documentary entitled The Mysterious Islands.

Criticism 
Phillips' teachings have been criticized as promoting a biblical worldview that is considered by some to be oppressive to women and girls. In 2014, Michael Farris, the chairman and cofounder of the Home School Legal Defense Association, criticized the biblical patriarchy beliefs of his former HSLDA colleague Doug Phillips, and said he regrets not speaking out against him sooner. He said, He was teaching that girls should never go to college. . . I started a college where half the student body is female and PHC just elected a woman student as the president of the student body. He was teaching that girls should basically stay in their father's home until marriage. I sent my oldest daughter off to Cedarville University and my second daughter off to Romania as a missionary. I thought my actions would speak louder than his words. I wish I had used words too.

Resignation, sexual abuse allegations
Phillips resigned as president of Vision Forum on October 30, 2013 after acknowledging a "lengthy ... relationship with a woman" which was "inappropriately affectionate and romantic." On November 11, 2013, Vision Forum Ministries' board of directors discontinued operations citing "serious sins" which prompted Phillips' resignation. According to The Christian Post, Vision Forum, Inc., Phillips' for-profit business, "appeared to have a liquidation sale" in December 2013.
 
On April 15, 2014, the Phillips family's ex-nanny filed a lawsuit against Phillips and Vision Forum, alleging that she had suffered years of sexual abuse at the hands of Doug Phillips. Phillips denied the abuse charges, according to Julie Ingersoll, "calling them sensationalist and suggesting that they are motivated by a desire for financial gain."

On November 17, 2014, Phillips was excommunicated from Boerne Christian Assembly, the church that he founded. Phillips had left the church in July.

Books
He has written or edited the following books (published by his own company Vision Forum):
 The Bible Lessons of John Quincy Adams for His Son (2000) Vision Forum  
 The Letters and Lessons of Teddy Roosevelt for His Sons (2001) Vision Forum   
 Robert Lewis Dabney: The Prophet Speaks (2003) Vision Forum 
 Poems for Patriarchs (2003) Poems for Patriarchs Vision Forum  
 The Birkenhead Drill (2004) Vision Forum   
 The Little Boy Down the Road: Short Stories & Essays on the Beauty of Family Life (2008) Vision Forum

References

External links
 

Living people
Baptist ministers from the United States
Baptist writers
American Christian Young Earth creationists
Religious scandals
American male writers
1965 births